Emilie-Claire Barlow (born 6 June 1976) is a Canadian singer, arranger, record producer, and voice actress. She has released several albums on her label, Empress Music Group, and has voiced characters for animated television series. She performs in English, French, and Portuguese.

Barlow's first album, Sings, was released in 1998. She has received seven nominations for Canada's Juno Awards with her album Seule ce soir winning for best Jazz Vocal Recording in 2013 and Clear Day winning the same award in 2016. Seule ce soir also won Album of the Year – Jazz Interpretation at the 2013 ADISQ Awards.  Barlow was also nominated for the Jack Richardson Producer of the Year Award at the 2016 Juno Awards.

Barlow was named Female Vocalist of the Year at the 2008 National Jazz Awards. She has named as influences Ella Fitzgerald, Tony Bennett, and Stevie Wonder.

Barlow has voiced various characters for animated television series, including Sailor Mars and Sailor Venus in Sailor Moon, Courtney, Laurie and Ellody in the Total Drama series, Chrissy in 6teen, Mrs. Ridgemount in Stoked, Bunny in Almost Naked Animals and Theresa Falcone (MacDougall) in Fugget About It.Early life
Born in Toronto to parents who were professional musicians, Barlow grew up in recording studios and by age seven had begun a career singing television and radio commercials. Barlow's grandfathers were ventriloquist Cy Leonard and actor Bob Homme (who played The Friendly Giant). Her father is award-winning jazz drummer Brian Barlow (aka Brian Leonard). Her mother, Judy Tate, is a composer, arranger and singer. Her uncle was Richard Homme, a Canadian jazz bassist who died 6 May 2011.

She was encouraged by her parents to sing and study several instruments including piano, cello, clarinet, and violin. Barlow studied voice at the Etobicoke School of Arts and music theory and arranging at Humber College.

Discography

 Sings (Rhythm Tracks, 1998)
 Tribute (Rhythm Tracks, 2001)
 Happy Feet (Rhythm Tracks, 2003)
 Like a Lover (Empress, 2005)
 Winter Wonderland (Empress, 2006)
 The Very Thought of You (Empress, 2007)
 Haven't We Met? (Empress, 2009)
 The Beat Goes On (Empress, 2010)
 Seule ce soir (Empress, 2012)
 Live in Tokyo (eOne, 2014)
 Clear Day (eOne, 2015)
 Lumières d'hiver (Empress, 2017)

As guest
 Peter Appleyard, Sophisticated Ladies, (Linus, 2012)
 Melanie Doane, A Thousand Nights (Prairie Ocean, 2008)
 Matt Dusk, My Funny Valentine: The Chet Baker Songbook (Royal Crown, 2013)
 Dave Weckl and Jay Oliver, Carousel'' (self-release, 2014)

Awards

Filmography

Movies

TV

References

External links

 
 
 

1976 births
20th-century Canadian actresses
20th-century Canadian women singers
21st-century Canadian actresses
21st-century Canadian women singers
Actresses from Toronto
Canadian voice actresses
Canadian women jazz singers
French-language singers of Canada
Juno Award for Vocal Jazz Album of the Year winners
Living people
Musicians from Toronto
Portuguese-language singers of Canada